Fish pie, also known as fisherman's pie, is a traditional British dish.

Origins 
According to Cook's Illustrated, the dish likely was created as a dish for Lent that made use of fish scraps. John Murrell's 1615 A New Booke of Cookerie contained recipes for eel and carp pies that called for scraps. Jessup Whitehead's 1889 The Steward’s Handbook and Guide to Party Catering instructs the cook to poach the fish, then drain it and cover it in cream before baking.

Ingredients 
The pie is usually made with fresh and smoked fish (for example cod, haddock, salmon or halibut) or seafood in a white sauce or cheddar cheese sauce made using the milk the fish was poached in. Hard boiled eggs are a common additional ingredient. Parsley or chives are sometimes added to the sauce. It is oven-baked in a deep dish but is not usually made with the shortcrust or puff pastry casing that is associated with most savoury pies (e.g. steak and kidney pie).

In place of a pastry casing enclosing the pie, a topping of mashed potatoes (sometimes with cheese or vegetables such as onions and leeks added) is used to cover the fish during baking. The dish is sometimes referred to as "fisherman's pie" because the mashed potato topping is similar to that used for shepherd's pie.

Royal fish pie
Gifts of fish pie to the king were a common tradition for various occasions. In a Lenten tradition, the town of Yarmouth was required to bake 100 herrings into two dozen pies and send them to the king. The prior of Llanthony, Gloucester, baked eels and carp into a pie as a gift to Henry VIII in 1530. In 1752 one was sent to the Prince of Wales. The tradition was also recorded during the reign of Queen Victoria.

Gallery

See also

 Stargazy pie
 Shepherd's pie, an unrelated meat-based dish which also uses potato instead of pastry
 List of pies, tarts and flans

Notes

References
 Murdoch (2004) Essential Seafood Cookbook Pies, casseroles and bakes, pp. 254–295. Murdoch Books. .

External links
 How to cook perfect fish pie The Guardian, 27 January 2011.
 Recipes for luxury fish pie and fisherman's pie from the BBC Food website.

British pies
New Zealand pies
Fish dishes
Potato dishes
Savoury pies
British seafood dishes